The 1991 IIHF European U18 Championship was the twenty-fourth playing of the IIHF European Junior Championships.   The Soviets, playing for the last time as a unified nation, placed 2nd, and the Germans, playing for the first time as a unified nation, placed 5th (despite allowing 61 goals in 6 games).

Group A
Played April 4–11  in Spišská Nová Ves and Prešov, Czechoslovakia.

First round 
Group 1

Group 2

Final round
Championship round

7th place

France was relegated to Group B for 1992.  The Soviet Union competed for the last time, Russia assumed their spot in Group A, while Latvia, Estonia, Lithuania, Belarus, and Ukraine, all began competing in Group C in 1993.  Kazakhstan also began competing in 1993, but they participated in the Asian Junior Championships.

Tournament Awards
Top Scorer  Peter Forsberg (17 points)
Top Goalie: Milan Hnilicka
Top Defenceman:Roman Hamrlík
Top Forward: Alexei Kovalev

Group B 
Played March 23–30 in Jaca, Spain.  The hosts were winless until they beat the Dutch on the final day, avoiding relegation.

First round
Group 1

Group 2

Final round 
Championship round

Placing round

Switzerland was promoted to Group A and the Netherlands was relegated to Group C, for 1992.

 Group C 
Played March 7–10, 1991 in Sofia, Bulgaria.  Great Britain was promoted to Group B for 1992.''

References

Complete results

Junior
IIHF European Junior Championship tournament
Spišská Nová Ves
Prešov
International ice hockey competitions hosted by Czechoslovakia
Junior
IIHF European U18 Championship
IIHF European U18 Championship
International ice hockey competitions hosted by Spain
Junior
Junior
International ice hockey competitions hosted by Bulgaria
Sports competitions in Sofia
1990s in Sofia